Gabriel Décamps (born 7 August 1999) is a Brazilian tennis player.

Décamps has a career high ATP singles ranking of 262 achieved on 19 September 2022. He also has a career high doubles ranking of 496 achieved on 25 July 2022.

Décamps has won 1 ATP Challenger doubles title at the 2022 Shymkent Challenger with Antoine Bellier.

Décamps played college tennis at Central Florida.

Tour titles

Doubles

References

External links
 
 

1999 births
Living people
Brazilian male tennis players
Sportspeople from São Paulo
UCF Knights men's tennis players